A white squall is a sudden and violent windstorm at sea which is not accompanied by the black clouds generally characteristic of a squall. It manifests as a sudden increase in wind velocity in tropical and sub-tropical waters, and may be a microburst. The name refers to the white-capped waves and broken water, its meager warning to any unlucky seaman caught in its path.  A white squall was allegedly behind the sinking of the brigantine Albatross on May 2, 1961 although, in fact, there were a number of traditional line squalls all around and a microburst was very unlikely. White squalls are rare at sea, but common on the Great Lakes of North America.

Historical incidents
White squalls are the culprits of many sea stories and have been blamed for a few tragedies. A white squall was the reported cause of the loss of the schooner Paul Pry off Cape Schanck, Australia, on September 3, 1841. In May 1986, the Pride of Baltimore, a modern  schooner, was reportedly struck by a white squall. The Toro, a Norwegian freighter, picked them up at 2:30 a.m. May 19, 1986. An eyewitness account described it as follows:
"A tremendous whistling sound suddenly roared through the rigging and a wall of wind hit us in the back. The Pride heeled over in a matter of seconds. She sank in minutes."

In literature and the arts
In Patrick O'Brian's 1973 novel HMS Surprise a White Squall is experienced by the crew of Surprise en route to the Malay Peninsula north of the equator off the Saint Peter and Saint Paul Archipelago near  Brazil.
Stan Rogers' 1984 song "White Squall" is about the white squalls of the Great Lakes.
Ridley Scott's 1996 film White Squall tells the story of the 1961 sinking of the Albatross.

See also 

 Rogue wave
 Microburst
 Meteotsunami

References

Severe weather and convection
Meteorological phenomena